John S. Gallagher (April 24, 1849 – June 17, 1920) was an Ontario merchant and political figure. He represented Frontenac in the Legislative Assembly of Ontario from 1898 to 1911 as a Conservative member.

He was born in Bastard Township, Leeds County, Upper Canada in 1849. He served as treasurer for the township and was chairman of the High School Board for Leeds. Gallagher was a hay and grain dealer in Harrowsmith. In 1881, he married a Miss Mills. He was an unsuccessful candidate for the provincial assembly in 1894.

He died in Portland on June 17, 1920.

References 

 Canadian Parliamentary Guide, 1903, AJ Magurn

External links 

1849 births
1920 deaths
Progressive Conservative Party of Ontario MPPs